Client-side persistent data or CSPD is a term used in computing for storing data required by web applications to complete internet tasks on the client-side as needed rather than exclusively on the server. As a framework it is one solution to the needs of Occasionally connected computing or OCC. 

A major challenge for HTTP as a stateless protocol has been asynchronous tasks. The AJAX pattern using XMLHttpRequest was first introduced by Microsoft in the context of the Outlook e-mail product.

The first CSPD were the 'cookies' introduced by the Netscape Navigator.  ActiveX components which have entries in the Windows registry can also be viewed as a form of client-side persistence.

See also
 Occasionally connected computing
 Curl (programming_language)
 AJAX
 HTTP
 Web storage

External links
 CSPD
 Safari preview
 Netscape  on persistent client state

Clients (computing)
Data management
Web applications